Mirtha Esther Vásquez Chuquilín (born 31 March 1975) is a Peruvian attorney and politician who served as prime minister of Peru from 6 October 2021 to 31 January 2022. Previously, she briefly served in Congress for the complementary term between March 2020 and July 2021, representing the constituency of Cajamarca as an independent within the Broad Front parliamentary caucus.

Early life and education 
Born in the northern region of Cajamarca, Vásquez earned a law degree from National University of Cajamarca and subsequently attained a master's degree in social management at the Pontifical Catholic University of Peru.

Career 
Vásquez has been a lecturer at her alma mater, the National University of Cajamarca. She has also served as an attorney and executive secretary for Grufides, a human rights and environment protection think-tank based in Cajamarca. She also defended the Association for Human Rights (APRODEH), and served as a member of the Board of Directors of the National Coordinator of Human Rights. She was also a columnist for Noticias SER.

Elected to the Peruvian Congress in the 2020 parliamentary election, Vásquez represented the Cajamarca constituency and the Broad Front coalition as an independent. Following Manuel Merino's resignation as President of Peru on 15 November 2020, she was elected First Vice President of Congress, as part of the congressional list led by Francisco Sagasti. As Sagasti took over the presidency via constitutional succession as President of Congress, Vásquez served ad interim in the position.

On 6 October 2021, Vásquez was appointed as the prime minister of Peru by president Pedro Castillo. She is the sixth woman to hold the office. She resigned on 31 January 2022, precipitating a cabinet reshuffle by Castillo.

External links
Official Site

References

1975 births
Living people
Pontifical Catholic University of Peru alumni
Peruvian women lawyers
Peruvian columnists
Peruvian women columnists
Members of the Congress of the Republic of Peru
People from Cajamarca
21st-century Peruvian politicians
21st-century Peruvian women politicians
Prime Ministers of Peru
21st-century Peruvian lawyers
Women members of the Congress of the Republic of Peru
Women prime ministers